Liliana Abud (born 5 July 1948) is an actress in telenovelas and Mexican cinema. She is also a screenwriter of telenovelas.
Abud played Raquel Rodríguez, the main character in the educational television program Destinos.

As an actress

Films
 Íntimo terror (1992)
 Vieja moralidad as Benedicta (1988)
 La dama o el león (1986)
 La doncella sabia (1986)
 El gato con botas (1986)
 Hansel y Gretel (1986)
 El niño que quiso temblar (1986)
 Rapunzel (1986)
 El Rey Midas (1986)
 El ruiseñor chino (1986)

Telenovelas
 Mi segunda madre as Sonia(1989)
 Rosa Salvaje as Cándida Linares (1987)
 Herencia maldita as Clara Velarde (1986)
 Tú o nadie as Camila Lombardo (1985)
 Un solo corazón as Maria (1983)
 Gabriel y Gabriela (1982)
 Limosna de amor, Una as Daniela (1981)
 Colorina as Alba (1980)
 La divina Sarah as Lysiana (1980)
 Espejismo (1980)
 Amor prohibido as Silvia (1979)
 Cartas para una victima (1978)
 Gotita de gente as Martha Rivera Valdes (1978)

Television shows
 Destinos as Raquel Rodríguez (1992)

As a writer

Original writing
Barrera de amor (2005)
La Esposa virgen (2005)Amarte es mi pecado (2004)La Otra (2002)Los Parientes Pobres (1993)Atrapada (1991)Amor en silencio (1988)Cicatrices del alma (1986)

Adaptation
 A que no me dejas (2015)
 Que te perdone Dios (2015)
 La tempestad (2013)Triunfo Del Amor  (2010-2011)Corazón salvaje  (telenovela de 2009)Fuego en la sangre (2008)Mundo de Fieras (2006)La madrastra (2005)Mariana de la noche (2003)Entre el amor y el odio (2002)Abrázame muy fuerte (2000)Rosalinda (1999)El privilegio de amar (1998)La antorcha encendida (1997)El vuelo del águila (1996)Yo compro esa mujer'' (1990)

External links
 

1948 births
Living people
Mexican film actresses
Mexican telenovela actresses
Mexican women screenwriters
Mexican people of Lebanese descent